The Collins oxidation is an organic reaction for the oxidation of primary alcohols to aldehydes.  It is distinguished from other chromium oxide-based oxidations by the use of Collins reagent, a complex of chromium(VI) oxide with pyridine in dichloromethane.

Mechanism 
The mechanism of the Collins oxidation is a relatively simple oxidation process.

History 
The collins oxidation first came about in 1968 when J.C. Collins used pre-formed CrO3•2Pyr dissolved in dichloromethane to oxidize alcohols. Although difficult, it was beneficial at the time because it provided an alternative to the Sarett oxidation, that used pyridine as a solvent. The Collins oxidation allowed for a less basic reagent, which in turn provided a useful option for oxidation of primary alcohols to aldehydes.

A safer variant of the Collins oxidation was discovered in 1970 by Ratcliffe and Rodehorst. The variant featured an in situ preparation of the Collins reagent by adding one equivalent of CrO3 over two equivalents of pyridine in dichloromethane.

Benefits 
The Collins oxidation is also very useful because it is cheap in comparison to its oxidizing counterparts, PCC and PDC. However, it is more difficult experimentally because of its required anhydrous conditions. The Collins oxidation is a good option when using uncomplicated substrates because it produces good yields of aldehyde and ketone products. However, as the complexity of the substrates increases, the usefulness of the Collins oxidation decreases because it lacks the selectivity that other reagents have.

Uses 
One of the main uses of the Collins oxidation is the transformation of alkenes to enones by adding carbonyl groups to allylic positions. While this process is very slow, it allows for alcohols to be oxidized to aldehydes or ketones without alkene interference.

The Collins oxidation can also be used to form cyclic chromate esters from 1,2-diols in order to them intramolecularly oxidize alkenes. This process can then result in the formation of highly stereoselective tetrahydrofuran.

Related oxidation reactions
Several chromium oxides are used for related oxidations. These include Jones oxidation and Sarett oxidation.

See also
 Jones oxidation
 Sarett oxidation

References

Organic oxidation reactions
Name reactions